The Italian Social Republic (RSI), known prior to December 1943 as the National Republican State of Italy (SNRI), but more popularly known as the Republic of Salò, was a Nazi-German puppet state with limited diplomatic recognition which was created during the later part of World War II, that existed from the beginning of the German occupation of Italy in September 1943 until the surrender of German troops in Italy in May 1945. The German occupation triggered widespread national resistance against it and the Italian Social Republic, leading to the Italian Civil War.

The Italian Social Republic was the second and last incarnation of the Italian Fascist state, led by Benito Mussolini and his reformed anti-monarchist Republican Fascist Party. The newly-founded state declared Rome its capital but was de facto centred on Salò (hence its colloquial name), a small town on Lake Garda, near Brescia, where Mussolini and the Ministry of Foreign Affairs were headquartered. The Italian Social Republic nominally exercised sovereignty in Northern and Central Italy, but was largely dependent on German troops to maintain control.

In July 1943, after the Allies had pushed Italy out of North Africa and subsequently invaded Sicily, the Grand Council of Fascism—with the support of King Victor Emmanuel III—overthrew and arrested Mussolini. The new government began secret peace negotiations with the Allied powers. When the Armistice of Cassibile was announced 8 September, Nazi Germany was prepared and quickly intervened. German troops seized control of the northern half of Italy, freed Mussolini, and brought him to the German-occupied area to establish a satellite regime. The Italian Social Republic was proclaimed on 23 September 1943. Although the RSI claimed sovereignty over most of the Italian Peninsula, its de facto jurisdiction only extended to a vastly reduced portion of the country. The RSI received diplomatic recognition only from the Axis powers and their satellite states. Finland and Vichy France, although in the German orbit, did not recognize it. Unofficial relations were maintained with Argentina, Portugal, Spain and, through commercial agents, Switzerland. The Vatican City did not recognize the RSI.

Around 25 April 1945, nineteen months after its founding, the RSI all but collapsed. In Italy, the day is known as Liberation Day (festa della liberazione). On that day, a general partisan uprising, alongside the efforts of Allied forces during their final offensive in Italy, managed to oust the Germans from Italy almost entirely. On 27 April, Italian partisans caught Mussolini, his mistress, several RSI ministers, and several other Italian Fascists, while they were attempting to flee. On 28 April, the partisans shot and killed Mussolini and most of the other captives, including Clara Petacci. The RSI Minister of Defense Rodolfo Graziani surrendered what was left of the Italian Social Republic on 1 May, one day after the German forces in Italy capitulated.

Context of its creation 

On 24 July 1943, after the Allied landings in Sicily, on a motion by Dino Grandi, the Grand Council of Fascism voted a motion of no confidence in Mussolini. Mussolini's authority had been undermined by a series of military defeats from the start of Italy's entry into the war during June 1940, including the bombing of Rome, the loss of the African colonies and the Allied invasions of Sicily and the southern Italian Peninsula.

The next day, King Victor Emmanuel III dismissed Mussolini from office, ordered him arrested and appointed Marshal Pietro Badoglio as new Prime Minister. By this time, the monarchy, a number of Fascist government members and the general Italian population had grown tired of the futile war effort which had driven Italy into subordination and subjugation by Nazi Germany. The failed war effort left Mussolini humiliated at home and abroad as a "sawdust Caesar". The new government began secret negotiations with the Allied powers and made preparations for the capitulation of Italy. These surrender talks implied a commitment from Badoglio to leave the Axis alliance.

While the Germans formally recognised the new status quo in Italian politics, they intervened by sending some of the best units of the Wehrmacht to Italy. This was done both to resist new Allied advances and to face the predictably imminent defection of Italy. While Badoglio continued to swear loyalty to Germany and the Axis powers, Italian government emissaries prepared to sign an armistice at Cassibile in Allied-occupied Sicily, which was finalized on 3 September.

On 8 September, Badoglio announced Italy's armistice with the Allies (although termed an "armistice", its terms made it akin to an unconditional surrender). German Führer Adolf Hitler and his staff, long aware of the negotiations, acted immediately by ordering German troops to seize control of Northern and Central Italy. The Germans quickly occupied Italy, disarmed the Italian troops and took over all of the Italian Army's materials and equipment, meeting only limited resistance. The Germans also dissolved the Italian occupation zone in southeastern France and forced Italian troops stationed there to leave. The Italian armed forces were not given clear orders to resist the Germans after the armistice and so resistance to the German takeover was scattered and of little effect. King Victor Emmanuel made no effort to rally resistance to the Germans, instead fleeing with his retinue to the safety of the Allied lines. On 10 September 1943, after two days of battle between the Wehrmacht and the remnants of the Royal Italian Army, Rome fell to the Germans.

The new Italian government had moved Mussolini from place to place while he was in captivity in an attempt to foil any attempts at rescue. Despite this, the Germans eventually pinpointed Mussolini at the Hotel Campo Imperatore at Gran Sasso. On 12 September, Mussolini was freed by the Germans in Operation Eiche (directed by SS-Obersturmbannführer Otto Skorzeny) in the mountains of Abruzzo. After being freed, Mussolini was flown to Bavaria. Gathering what support he still had among the Italian population, his liberation made it possible for a new German-dependent Fascist Italian state to be created.

Foreign relations

Establishment by Nazi Germany 

Three days following his rescue in the Gran Sasso raid, Mussolini was taken to Germany for a meeting with Hitler in Rastenburg at his headquarters in East Prussia. While Mussolini was in poor health and wanted to retire, Hitler wanted him to return to Italy and start a new Fascist state under the protection of the Wehrmacht. When Mussolini baulked, tired of the responsibilities of the war and unwilling to retake power, Hitler told him the alternative would be a German military administration that would treat Italy no differently from other occupied countries. Hitler also threatened to destroy Milan, Genoa and Turin unless Mussolini agreed to set up a revived Fascist government. Reluctantly, Mussolini agreed to Hitler's demands.

Mussolini returned to Italy and settled in Milan, from where on 15 September he announced the creation of the Republican Fascist Party and, three days later, the resumption of the war alongside Germany and Japan. The Duce immediately announced the formation of a new republican cabinet, although they actually came from a list chosen and appointed by Hitler himself. The Italian Social Republic was proclaimed on 23 September, with Mussolini as both chief of state and prime minister. The RSI claimed Rome as its capital, but the de facto capital became the small town of Salò on Lake Garda, midway between Milan and Venice, where Mussolini resided along with the foreign office of the RSI. While Rome itself was still under Axis control at the time, given the city's proximity to Allied lines and the threat of civil unrest, neither the Germans nor Mussolini himself wanted him to return to Rome.

On 18 September, Mussolini made his first public address to the Italian people since his rescue, in which he commended the loyalty of Hitler as an ally while condemning Victor Emmanuel for betraying Italian Fascism. He declared: "It is not the regime that has betrayed the monarchy, it is the monarchy that has betrayed the regime". He also formally repudiated his previous support of the monarchy, saying: "When a monarchy fails in its duties, it loses every reason for being…The state we want to establish will be national and social in the highest sense of the word; that is, it will be Fascist, thus returning to our origins".

From the start, the Italian Social Republic was little more than a puppet state dependent entirely upon Germany. Mussolini himself knew this; even as he stated in public that he was in full control of the RSI, he was well aware that he was little more than the Gauleiter of Lombardy. The SS kept Mussolini under what amounted to house arrest; it monitored his communications and controlled his travel. Mussolini later said that he would have preferred being sent to a concentration camp to the manner that the SS treated him. Real power rested with  German General Plenipotentiary Rudolf Rahn and SS-Obergruppenführer Karl Wolff, the commander of the German occupying forces in Italy.

The RSI had no constitution or organized economy, and its financing was dependent entirely on funding from Berlin. German forces themselves had little respect for Mussolini's failed fascism, and considered the regime merely as a tool for maintaining order, such as repressing the Italian partisans. This work was also carried out by the infamous Pietro Koch and the Banda Koch on Germany's behalf.

The RSI received diplomatic recognition from only Germany, Imperial Japan and their puppet states. Even the otherwise sympathetic Spain refused to establish formal diplomatic relations with the RSI.

The RSI took revenge against the 19 members who had voted against Mussolini on the Grand Council with the Verona trial (processo di Verona) which handed down a death sentence to all of the accused but one. Only six of the 19 were in RSI custody (Giovanni Marinelli, Carlo Pareschi, Luciano Gottardi, Tullio Cianetti, Emilio De Bono and Mussolini's own son-in-law Galeazzo Ciano). With the exception of Tullio Cianetti, who received a life sentence, they were all executed on 11 January 1944 in the fort of San Procolo in Verona.

Territorial losses 
The changing political and military situation re-opened questions regarding the status of Italian territories, particularly those with German-speaking majorities that were formerly under Austrian rule. Previously, Hitler had vigorously suppressed any campaigning for the return of lands such as South Tyrol in order to maintain good relations with his Italian ally. In the aftermath of the Kingdom of Italy's abandonment of the Axis on 8 September 1943, Germany seized and de facto incorporated some Italian territories. However, Hitler refused to officially annex South Tyrol in spite of urging by local German officials and instead supported having the RSI hold official sovereignty over these territories and forbade all measures that would give the impression of official annexation of South Tyrol. However, in practice the territory of South Tyrol within the boundaries defined by Germany as Operationszone Alpenvorland that included Trento, Bolzano and Belluno were de facto incorporated into Germany's Reichsgau Tirol-Vorarlberg and administered by its Gauleiter Franz Hofer. The region identified by Germany as Operationszone Adriatisches Küstenland that included Udine, Gorizia, Trieste, Pola and Fiume were de facto incorporated into Reichsgau Kärnten and administered by its Gauleiter Friedrich Rainer.

On 10 September 1943, the Independent State of Croatia (NDH) declared that the Treaties of Rome of 18 May 1941 with the Kingdom of Italy were null and void and annexed the portion of Dalmatia that had been ceded to Italy as part of those treaties. The NDH attempted to annex Zara, which had been a recognized territory of Italy since 1919, but Germany prevented the NDH from doing this. Because of these actions, the RSI held the NDH in contempt and refused to have diplomatic relations with the NDH or to recognize its territorial claims.

After the Italian capitulation, the Italian Islands of the Aegean were occupied by the Germans (see Dodecanese campaign). During the German occupation, the islands remained under the nominal sovereignty of the RSI but were de facto subject to the German military command.

The Italian concession of Tientsin in China was ceded by the RSI to the Japanese puppet Wang Jingwei regime.

Economy and war effort 

During the existence of the Italian Social Republic, Mussolini, whose former government had banned trade unions and strikes, began to make increasingly populist appeals to the working class. He claimed to regret many of the decisions made earlier in supporting the interests of big business and promised a new beginning if the Italian people would be willing to grant him a second chance. Mussolini claimed that he had never totally abandoned his left-wing influences, insisting he had attempted to nationalize property in 1939–1940 but had been forced to delay such action for tactical reasons related to the war. With the removal of the monarchy, Mussolini claimed the full ideology of Fascism could be pursued; and to gain popular support he reversed over twenty years of Fascist policy of backing private property and relative economic independence by ordering the nationalization of all companies with over 100 employees. Mussolini even reached out to ex-communist Nicola Bombacci to help him in spreading the image that Fascism was a progressive movement. The economic policy of the RSI was given the name "Socialization" and Mussolini had even considered the idea of calling his new republic the "Italian 'Socialist' Republic". In practice, little resulted from the declared socialization of the economy. Unions did not exert real control of their management and took no part in state planning (as they had the power to do on paper after the socialization). The Italian industrial sector was excluded from the new reforms by the Germans and Italian industrialists were opposed to the changes in any case. The Italian labour force (large parts of which had remained leftist despite fascist rule) regarded socialization as a sham and responded with a massive strike on 1 March 1944.

In Greece, while the government of the Kingdom of Italy surrendered and many Italian soldiers in the Aegean were tired of the war and had become opposed to Mussolini, Italian Fascist loyalists remained allied to Germany in the Greek campaign; German forces in Greece convinced 10,000 Italians in the Aegean to continue to support their war effort.

In 1944, Mussolini urged Hitler to focus on destroying Britain rather than the Soviet Union, as Mussolini claimed that it was Britain which had turned the conflict into a world war and that the British Empire must be destroyed in order for peace to come in Europe. Mussolini wanted to conduct a small offensive along the Gothic Line against the Allies with his new RSI Divisions; in December 1944, the Alpine Division "Monte Rosa" with some German battalions fought the Battle of Garfagnana with some success. As the situation became desperate with Allied forces in control of most of Italy and from February 1945 resumed pushing the Axis forces north of the Gothic Line, Mussolini declared that "he would fight to the last Italian" and spoke of turning Milan into the "Stalingrad of Italy", where Fascism would make its last glorious fight. Despite such strong rhetoric, Mussolini considered evacuating Fascists into Switzerland, although this was opposed by Germany, which instead proposed that Mussolini and key Fascist officials be taken into exile in Germany. Further disintegration of support for his government occurred as fascist and German military officials secretly tried to negotiate a truce with Allied forces, without consulting either Mussolini or Hitler.

RSI military formations 
Women volunteers served in uniform as noncombatants in paramilitary units and police formations (Servizio Ausiliario Femminile). The commander was the brigadier general Piera Gatteschi Fondelli.

Army 

Smaller units like the Black Brigades (Brigate nere) led by Alessandro Pavolini and the Decima Flottiglia MAS led by Junio Valerio Borghese (called "principe nero", the Black Prince) fought for the RSI during its entire existence. The Germans were satisfied if these units were able to participate in anti-partisan activities. While varying in their effectiveness, some of these units surpassed expectations.

In March 1944, the bulk of the 1st Italian volunteers Storm Brigade were sent to the Anzio beachhead where they fought alongside their German allies, receiving favourable reports and taking heavy losses. In recognition of their performance, Heinrich Himmler declared the unit to be fully integrated into the Waffen SS.

On 16 October 1943, the Rastenburg Protocol was signed with Nazi Germany and the RSI was allowed to raise division-sized military formations. This protocol allowed Marshal Rodolfo Graziani to raise four RSI divisions totalling 52,000 men. In July 1944, the first of these divisions completed training and was sent to the front.

Recruiting military forces was difficult for the RSI as most of the Italian Army had been interned by German forces in 1943, many military-aged Italians had been conscripted into forced labour in Germany and few wanted to participate in the war. The RSI became so desperate for soldiers that it granted convicts freedom if they would join the army and the sentence of death was imposed on anyone who opposed being conscripted. Autonomous military forces in the RSI also fought against the Allies including the notorious Decima Flottiglia MAS of Prince Junio Valerio Borghese. Borghese held no allegiance to Mussolini and even suggested that he would take him prisoner if he could.

During the winter of 1944–1945, armed Italians were on both sides of the Gothic Line. On the Allied side were four Italian groups of volunteers from the old Italian army. These Italian volunteers were equipped and trained by the British. On the Axis side were four RSI divisions. Three of the RSI divisions, the 2nd Italian "Littorio" Infantry Division, the 3rd Italian "San Marco" Marine Division and the 4th Italian Monterosa Alpini Division were allocated to the LXXXXVII "Liguria" Army under Graziani and were placed to guard the western flank of the Gothic Line facing France. The fourth RSI division, the 1st Italian "Italia" Infantry Division, was attached to the German 14th Army in a sector of the Apennine Mountains thought least likely to be attacked.

On 26 December 1944, several sizeable RSI military units, including elements of the 4th Italian "Monterosa Division" Alpine Division and the 3rd Italian "San Marco" Marine Division, participated in Operation Winter Storm. This was a combined German and Italian offensive against the 92nd Infantry Division. The battle was fought in the Apennines. While limited in scale, this was a successful offensive and the RSI units did their part.

The RSI military was under the command of General Alfredo Guzzoni while Field Marshal Rodolfo Graziani, the former governor-general of Italian Libya, was the RSI's Minister of Defense and commander-in-chief of the German Army Group Liguria. Mussolini, as Duce and head of state of RSI assumed supreme command over all military forces of the RSI.

In February 1945, the 92nd Infantry Division again came up against RSI units. This time it was Bersaglieri of the 1st Italian "Italia" Infantry Division. The Italians successfully halted the United States division's advance.

However, the situation continued to deteriorate for the Axis forces on Gothic Line. By mid-April, the final Allied offensive in Italy had led German defences to collapse. At the end of that month, the last remaining troops of RSI were bottled up along with two Wehrmacht Divisions at Collecchio by 1st Brazilian Division being forced to surrender after some days of fighting.

On 29 April, Graziani surrendered and was present at Caserta when a representative of German General Heinrich von Vietinghoff-Scheel signed the unconditional instrument of surrender for all Axis forces in Italy, but since the Allies had never recognised the RSI Graziani's signature was not required at Caserta. The surrender was to take effect on 2 May; Graziani ordered the RSI forces under his command to lay down their arms on 1 May.

Air Force 

The National Republican Air Force (Aeronautica Nazionale Repubblicana or ANR) was the air force of Italian Social Republic and also the air unit of National Republican Army in World War II. Its tactical organization was: 3 Fighter Groups, 1 Air Torpedo Bomber Group, 1 Bomber Group and other Transport and minor units. The ANR worked closely with German Air Force (Luftwaffe) in Northern Italy, even if the Germans unsuccessfully tried to disband the ANR forcing its pilots to enlist in the Luftwaffe.

In 1944, after the withdrawal of all German fighter units in the attempt to stop the increased Allied offensive on the German mainland, ANR fighter groups were left alone and heavily outnumbered to face the massive Allied air offensive over Northern Italy. In the operation time of 1944 and 1945, the ANR managed to shoot down 262 Allied aircraft with the loss of 158 in action.

Navy 

Little of the Regia Marina (Royal Italian Navy) joined the RSI. This was because the bulk of the Italian navy was ordered to steam to Malta at the time of the armistice, out of reach of the Germans and the RSI. The RSI's National Republican Navy (Marina Nazionale Repubblicana or MNR) only reached a twentieth the size of the co-belligerent Italian fleet. The RSI Navy largely consisted of nine motor torpedo boats (two large and seven small), dozens of MTSM small motor torpedo boats and MTM explosive motorboats. The National Republican Navy also operated fifteen CB-class midget submarines (ten in the Adriatic and five in the Black Sea) and one larger submarine, CM1.

Troops of the Decima Flottiglia MAS (elite Italian frogman corps) fought primarily as a land unit of the RSI.

Some of the naval personnel at the BETASOM submarine base in Bordeaux remained loyal to Mussolini.

Paramilitaries 
The fall of the Fascist regime in Italy and the disbandment of the MVSN saw the establishment of the National Republican Guard (Guardia Nazionale Repubblicana or GNR), the Republican Police Corps (Corpo di Polizia Repubblicana) and the emergence of the Black Brigades (brigate nere). The GNR consisted of former OVRA, carabinieri, soldiers, Italian Africa Police and others still loyal to the Fascist cause, while the Republican Police Corps was the successor agency of the Public security complex formed by the Directorate of Public Security and the Public Security Agents Corps. The Black Brigade was formed by the new fascist party members both young and old. Both units fought alongside Nazi Schutzstaffel (SS) counterparts in an extensive anti-partisan war. The Black Brigades committed many atrocities in their fight against the Italian resistance movement and political enemies. On 15 August 1944, the GNR became part of the Army.

Government 

Its head was Benito Mussolini.

The Government redacted a Constitution for the Italian Social Republic, but it was never discussed or approved. On 13 October 1943, it was announced that a Constitutent Assembly would be called to write a new Constitution, but that was cancelled by Mussolini on 14 November and delayed until after the end of the war.

The RSI was led by the Republican Fascist Party, established on 18 September 1943 out of the disbanded National Fascist Party. On 14 February 1945 Mussolini authorized the formation of a second political party called National Republican Socialist Rally (later rebranded into Italian Socialist Republican Party) under the leadership of Edmondo Cione: the party supported a leftist view of fascism, strongly focused on the socialization of the economy and included several former socialists, such as Pulvio Zocchi, Carlo Silvestri and Walter Mocchi. It was largely insignificant and its membership is unknown.

Legacy

In post-war Italian politics 
While the RSI supported Nazi Germany, it allowed the Italian Fascist movement to build a completely totalitarian state. During the preceding twenty years of the Fascist association with the Savoy monarchy of the Kingdom of Italy, some of the actions of the Fascists had been restricted by the monarchy. However, the formation of the RSI allowed Mussolini to be the official head of an Italian state and it also allowed the Fascists to return to their earlier republican stances. In one way or another, most of the prominent leaders of the post-war Italian far-right (parliamentary and extraparliamentary) were associated with the experience of the RSI. Among them were Filippo Anfuso, Pino Romualdi, Rodolfo Graziani, Junio Valerio Borghese, Licio Gelli and Giorgio Almirante. Most of the 8,000 Italian Jews who died in the Holocaust were killed during the 20 months of the Salò regime.

Stamps 
A number of postage stamps were issued by the Republic of Salò. Initially, existing Italian issues were overprinted with a fasces, or the initials "G.N.R." for the Republican National Guard. Later the government designed and printed three series, all of which are very common.

Currency 
Banknotes in 50, 100, 500, and 1000 lire denomination were printed by the Republic. As issuer, the country was not mentioned on them, but rather only the Bank of Italy.

In the arts 
Pier Paolo Pasolini's 1975 film Salò, or the 120 Days of Sodom is an adaptation of Marquis de Sade's The 120 Days of Sodom, set in the Republic of Salò instead of 18th century France. It uses the source material as an allegory; the atrocities in the movie did not actually happen, while most of the choices of milieus, clothing, uniforms, weapons and other details are historically correct. Roberto Benigni's 1997 Life is Beautiful is also set in the Republic of Salò.

Bernardo Bertolucci's 1976 Novecento set his story in Emilia, being at the time a province of the Italian Social Republic, even though this is never mentioned in the movie. Wild Blood tells the true story of the Fascist film stars Luisa Ferida and Osvaldo Valenti and their support for the Republic.

Futurist writer and poet Filippo Tommaso Marinetti, a Mussolini loyalist who had helped shape Fascist philosophy, remained in the RSI as a propagandist until his death from a heart attack at Bellagio in December 1944.

See also 

 29th Waffen Grenadier Division of the SS (1st Italian)
 Decima Flottiglia MAS
 Italian Civil War
 Italian Fascism
 National Republican Guard (Italy)
 Republican Police Corps

References

Further reading 
 Bosworth, R.J.B. Mussolini's Italy: Life Under the Fascist Dictatorship, 1915–1945 (2007)
 Gat, Moshe. "The Soviet Factor in British Policy towards Italy, 1943–1945," Historian (1988) 50#4 pp 535–557
 Knox, MacGregor. Common Destiny: Dictatorship, Foreign Policy, and War in Fascist Italy and Nazi Germany (2000)
 Maximiano, Cesar. with Bonalume, Ricardo N. & Bujeiro, Ramiro. Brazilian Expeditionary Force in World War II. Osprey Publishing Ltd., 2011.  (Print version).
 Morgan, Philip. The Fall of Mussolini: Italy, the Italians, and the Second World War (2007)
 Moseley, Ray. Mussolini: The Last 600 Days of Il Duce (2004)
 Smith, D. Mack. Modern Italy: A Political History (1997) online

External links 

 Fascist Italy and the Jews: Myth versus Reality an online lecture by Dr. Iael Nidam-Orvieto of Yad Vashem
 Axis History Factbook – Italy
 Comando Supremo
 Historical flags of Italy
 War flag of Italian Social Republic

 
1943 establishments in Italy

1945 disestablishments in Italy
Axis powers
Client states of Nazi Germany
Italian states
Former republics
Military history of Italy during World War II
States and territories established in 1943
States and territories disestablished in 1945
Totalitarian states
20th century rump states